Pomphorhynchus is a genus of parasitic worms belonging to the family Pomphorhynchidae.

The species of this genus are found in Europe and Northern America.

Species:

Pomphorhynchus bosniacus 
Pomphorhynchus bufonis 
Pomphorhynchus bulbocolli 
Pomphorhynchus bullocki Gupta and Lata, 1968
Pomphorhynchus cylindrica Wang and Gu, 1983
Pomphorhynchus dubious Kaw, 1941
Pomphorhynchus francoisae Golvan, 1969
Pomphorhynchus jammuensis Fotedar and Dhar, 1977
Pomphorhynchus kashmirensis Kaw, 1941
Pomphorhynchus kawi Fotedar, Duda and Raina, 1970
Pomphorhynchus kostylewi Petrochenko, 1956
Pomphorhynchus laevis (Zoega in Müller, 1776)  P. laevis is a parasitic acanthocephalan worm that can influence the reaction of its intermediate host, the freshwater amphipod Gammarus pulex, to the smell of potential predators like perch, Perca fluviatilis.  P. laevis facilitates its movement from its initial host. Research has demonstrated that organisms affected by the parasite exhibit a diminished or inverted avoidance response to the scent of predators when compared to uninfested specimens, supporting the notion that the parasite manipulates its host, with the goal of passing itself on to its definitive host, a freshwater fish. Affected specimens also demonstrate vibrant changes in color, making them more visible to predators.  This worm swells its proboscis to press microneedles into the intestinal wall, with a very strong adhesive force. This has inspired a structural skin graft adhesive that sticks strongly but has minimal tissue damage while in place and upon removal.
Pomphorhynchus lucyi Williams & Rogers, 1984
Pomphorhynchus megacanthus Fotedar and Dhar, 1977
Pomphorhynchus moyanoi Olmes and Habit, 2007
Pomphorhynchus omarsegundoi Arredondo and Gil de Pertierra, 2010
Pomphorhynchus oreini Fotedar and Dhar, 1977
Pomphorhynchus orientalis Fotedar and Dhar, 1977
Pomphorhynchus patagonicus Ortubay, Ubeda, Semenas and Kennedy, 1991
Pomphorhynchus perforator (von Linstow, 1908)
Pomphorhynchus purhepechus García-Varela, Mendoza-Garfias, Choudhury & Pérez-Ponce de León, 2017
Pomphorhynchus rocci Cordonnier & Ward, 1967
Pomphorhynchus sebastichthydis Yamaguti, 1939
Pomphorhynchus sphaericus Pertierra, Spatz and Doma, 1996
Pomphorhynchus spindletruncatus Amin, Abdullah and Mhaisen, 2003
Pomphorhynchus tereticollis (Rudolphi, 1809)
Pomphorhynchus tori Fotedar and Dhar, 1977
Pomphorhynchus yamagutii Schmidt and Higgins, 1973
Pomphorhynchus yunnanensis Wang, 1981
Pomphorhynchus zhoushanensis Li, Chen, Amin & Yang, 2017

References

Echinorhynchidae
Acanthocephala genera